Felix Walker (born 5 March 1935) is a Swiss economist and politician of the Christian Democratic People's Party (CVP/PDC).

In 1999, Walker was elected to the Swiss National Council in the Canton of St. Gallen. He presided the Council's Finance Committee in 2004 and 2005. In December 2006, Walker resigned from the National Council.

External links

CVP St. Gallen: Felix Walker 

1935 births
Living people
Members of the National Council (Switzerland)
Christian Democratic People's Party of Switzerland politicians